Christopher Carpenter may refer to:

 Chris Carpenter (born 1975), American baseball player
 Chris Carpenter (baseball, born 1985), American baseball player
  Christopher S. (Kitt) Carpenter, American economist
 Christopher Carpenter, a pseudonym of British writer Christopher Evans

See also
 Christopher Carpenter House, an historic house in Rehoboth, Massachusetts
Chris Carpenter (disambiguation)